The Oracle Challenger Series – Chicago is a professional tennis tournament played outdoor on hard courts. It is part of the Women's Tennis Association (WTA) 125K series and an ATP Challenger Tour. The tournament takes place at XS Tennis Village in Chicago, United States. From 2021 onwards, it became exclusively a WTA 125 tournament.

Past finals

Men's singles

Women's singles

Men's doubles

Women's doubles

External links
 Official website

 
ATP Challenger Tour
WTA 125 tournaments
Hard court tennis tournaments in the United States
2018 establishments in Illinois
Recurring sporting events established in 2018
Tennis in Chicago